Ambel is a municipality located in the province of Zaragoza, Aragon, Spain. According to the 2004 census (INE), the municipality had a population of 334 inhabitants.

References

External links
 

Municipalities in the Province of Zaragoza